Chadwick A. Trujillo (born November 22, 1973) is an American astronomer, discoverer of minor planets and the co-discoverer of Eris, the most massive dwarf planet known in the Solar System.

Trujillo works with computer software and has examined the orbits of the numerous trans-Neptunian objects (TNOs), which is the outer area of the Solar System that he specialized in. In late August 2005, it was announced that Trujillo, along with Michael Brown and David Rabinowitz, had discovered Eris in 2003. As a result of the discovery of the satellite Dysnomia, Eris was the first TNO known to be more massive than Pluto.

Career 

Trujillo attended Oak Park and River Forest High School in Oak Park, Illinois.  He received his B.Sc. in physics from the Massachusetts Institute of Technology in 1995, and was a member of the Xi chapter of Tau Epsilon Phi, and received his Ph.D. in astronomy from the University of Hawaii in 2000.

Between 2000 and 2003 Trujillo was a postdoctoral scholar at Caltech. In 2003, he started working as an astronomer at the Gemini Observatory in Hawaii.

In 2013 Trujillo became head of the Adaptive Optics/Telescope Department at the Gemini Observatory, and continued until 2016. As of 2016, Trujillo is assistant professor at the department of Astronomy and Planetary Science at Northern Arizona University.

He studies the Kuiper belt and the outer Solar System.

Discoveries 

Trujillo is credited by the Minor Planet Center with the discovery and co-discovery of 54 numbered minor planets between 1996 and 2013, including many trans-Neptunian objects (TNOs) from the Kuiper belt (see table). The last major TNO, Eris, was at first considered by him, his team, NASA, and many others to be the tenth planet, but the International Astronomical Union assigned it to the new classificatory category of dwarf planet.

The possible dwarf planets Trujillo discovered are:
 Quaoar, co-discovered with Brown
 Sedna, co-discovered with Brown and Rabinowitz, possibly the first known inner Oort cloud object
 Orcus, co-discovered with Brown and Rabinowitz
 Eris, co-discovered  with Brown and Rabinowitz – the only known TNO more massive than Pluto
 , discovery also claimed by the Sierra Nevada Observatory, Spain (also see José Luis Ortiz Moreno).
 , co-discovered with Brown and Rabinowitz in 2005, one of the first 5 official dwarf planets.

List of discovered minor planets 

The Minor Planet Center credits Chad Trujillo with the discovery and co-discovery of 57 minor planets during 1996–2013. His numerous co-discoverers were:  D. C. Jewitt,  J. X. Luu,  J. Chen,  K. Berney,  D. J. Tholen,  M. E. Brown,  W. Evans,  S. S. Sheppard,  D. L. Rabinowitz,  A. Udalski,  M. Kubiak,  R. Poleski and  Glenn Smith.

Satellites and uncredited discoveries

Honors and awards 
The main-belt asteroid 12101 Trujillo is named for him.

In 2006 he was named one of the Science Spectrum Magazine Trailblazer, top minority in science.

References

External links 

 

1973 births
American astronomers
Discoverers of trans-Neptunian objects

Eris (dwarf planet)
Living people
MIT Department of Physics alumni
Tau Epsilon Phi
Michael E. Brown
Scientists from Oak Park, Illinois
Planetary scientists
University of Hawaiʻi alumni